Roger Freestone (born 19 August 1968) is a former Wales international goalkeeper.

Club career
Born in Caerleon, near Newport, Monmouthshire, Freestone began his career at Newport County as a trainee before moving to Chelsea in 1987 for £95,000. During his time there he was never the established first choice, being behind Eddie Niedzwiecki, Kevin Hitchcock and Dave Beasant, and was loaned out to Swansea City and Hereford United. He eventually joined Swansea on a permanent deal in 1991, for a fee of £45,000, and went on to spend over a decade, the majority of his career, at the Welsh club.

In 2001 a rumoured move to rivals Cardiff City was met with anger from Swansea fans as they did not want to lose him. He left the club after thirteen years and went on to sign for Newport County in 2004, but his contract was cancelled several months later by mutual consent owing to recurring injury problems and he eventually retired.

The way in which he left Swansea City angered a lot of fans. Then-manager Kenny Jackett said he made a tough choice in releasing Roger Freestone and the supporters felt they had missed an opportunity to give a proper send-off that he deserved for his contribution.

Freestone is considered a legend among Swansea fans. In 1995, he briefly became the clubs penalty taker, where he converted three out of three spot-kicks. His talent as a shot stopper lead to him keeping 22 clean sheets in a season, which was a club record, until Dorus de Vries broke the record in the 2009–10 season.

International career
Freestone played for Wales at schoolboy, under-21 and B level before winning his first and only cap against Brazil in 2000.

Management career 
Freestone had a short-lived stint as manager at Swansea along with Nick Cusack. He currently manages youth side, Risca & Gelli United in the Islwyn Youth League.

Career statistics

Honours
Chelsea
Football League Second Division: 1988–89

Swansea City
Football League Third Division: 1999–2000
Football League Trophy: 1993–94
FAW Premier Cup runner-up: 2000–01, 2001–02
Football League Third Division play-offs runner-up: 1997

References

External links

Wales stats at 11v11

1968 births
Living people
People from Caerleon
Footballers from Newport, Wales
Welsh footballers
Wales youth international footballers
Wales under-21 international footballers
Wales international footballers
Association football goalkeepers
Chelsea F.C. players
Hereford United F.C. players
Newport County A.F.C. players
Swansea City A.F.C. players
English Football League players
Welsh football managers
Swansea City A.F.C. managers